Bryan Fontenot is an American politician, former law enforcement officer, and businessman serving as a member of the Louisiana House of Representatives from the 55th district. He assumed office on January 13, 2020.

Education 
Fontenot graduated from Thibodaux High School in 1996 and studied criminal justice at L. E. Fletcher Technical Community College.

Career 
Prior to entering politics, Fontenot owned Thibodaux Driving School and was an employee in the Lafourche Parish Sheriff's Office. He also served as a commander in the Thibodaux Police Department, where he was assigned to the Bureau of Narcotics. He is the owner and CEO of BRYCO Land Developments. In 2014, he was elected to serve as justice of the peace of Lafourche Parish, Louisiana. He was elected to the Louisiana House of Representatives in October 2019 and assumed office in January 2020.

Fontenot supports, and voted for passage out of committee, a bill in the Louisiana state legislature that would make in vitro fertilization (IVF) treatments and some forms of birth control a crime, and prosecute women who get abortions for murder. The draft bill has no exceptions for rape, incest, or the protection of the life of the mother and would likely also criminalize miscarriages.

References 

Living people
Republican Party members of the Louisiana House of Representatives
People from Thibodaux, Louisiana
People from Lafourche Parish, Louisiana
Year of birth missing (living people)